Guitar Junior may refer to:
Luther "Guitar Junior" Johnson (born 1939), blues singer and guitarist
Lonnie Brooks (1933–2017), blues singer and guitarist